The handball competition of the 2021 Junior Pan American Games in Cali, Colombia was held from 23 November to 4 December at the Iván Vassilev Todorov Arena, the events were played by U23 national teams and awarded one place in both genders to the handball tournament of the 2023 Pan American Games.

Participating teams

Men

Women

Medal summary

Medal table

Medalists

Men's tournament

Preliminary round
All times are local (UTC−5).

Group A

Group B

Classification round

5–8th place semifinals

Seventh place game

Fifth place game

Medal round

Semifinals

Bronze medal game

Final

Final standing

Women's tournament

Preliminary round
All times are local (UTC−5).

Group A

Group B

Classification round

5–8th place semifinals

Seventh place game

Fifth place game

Medal round

Semifinals

Bronze medal game

Final

Final standing

References

External links
Handball at the 2021 Junior Pan American Games

Handball
Junior Pan American Games
Junior Pan American Games
Qualification tournaments for the 2023 Pan American Games
International handball competitions hosted by Colombia